Peiting is a municipality  in the Weilheim-Schongau district, in Bavaria, Germany. It is situated on the right bank of the Lech, 3 km southeast of Schongau, and 17 km west of Weilheim in Oberbayern.

Transport
Both are located on the Schongau–Peißenberg line.

Notable people 
 Placidus Braun, Benedictine priest, historian and archivist
 Martin Echtler, ski mountaineer

References 

Weilheim-Schongau